In the area of modern algebra known as group theory, a Tarski monster group, named for Alfred Tarski, is an infinite group G, such that every proper subgroup H of G, other than the identity subgroup, is a cyclic group of order a fixed prime number p. A Tarski monster group is necessarily simple. It was shown by Alexander Yu. Olshanskii in 1979 that Tarski groups exist, and that there is a Tarski p-group for every prime p > 1075. They are a source of counterexamples to conjectures in group theory, most importantly to Burnside's problem and the von Neumann conjecture.

Definition
Let  be a fixed prime number. An infinite group  is called a Tarski monster group for  if every nontrivial subgroup (i.e. every subgroup other than 1 and G itself) has  elements.

Properties
  is necessarily finitely generated. In fact it is generated by every two non-commuting elements.
  is simple.
 The construction of Olshanskii shows in fact that there are continuum-many non-isomorphic Tarski Monster groups for each prime .
 Tarski monster groups are an example of non-amenable groups not containing a free subgroup.

References
A. Yu. Olshanskii, An infinite group with subgroups of prime orders, Math. USSR Izv. 16 (1981), 279–289; translation of Izvestia Akad. Nauk SSSR Ser. Matem. 44 (1980), 309–321.
A. Yu. Olshanskii, Groups of bounded period with subgroups of prime order, Algebra and Logic 21 (1983), 369–418; translation of Algebra i Logika 21 (1982), 553–618.

Infinite group theory
P-groups